Far from the Sun is the sixth studio album by Finnish heavy metal band Amorphis.

It was the first album to feature drummer Jan Rechberger since 1994's Tales from the Thousand Lakes, replacing Pekka Kasari who had quit the band to spend more time with his family. It was their last album to feature Pasi Koskinen on vocals.

The American release is packaged in a slipcase and features five bonus tracks and a video for "Evil Inside". The song, "Darkrooms" is also a bonus track for the Japanese edition.

The album was re-released in Europe in 2008 by Nuclear Blast. This new version includes all the bonus tracks that were previously only available on the American version and also has new artwork.

Track listing

Notes 
 Acoustic
 Music video

Personnel

Amorphis 
Amorphis – all music
Pasi Koskinen − vocals, lyrics
 Esa Holopainen − lead guitar
 Tomi Koivusaari − rhythm guitar
 Niclas Etelävuori − bass
 Santeri Kallio − keyboards
 Jan Rechberger − drums

Additional personnel 
 Mixed by Hiili Hiilesmaa at Finnvox Studios – Helsinki, Finland, February 2003
 Mastered by Thomas Eberger at Cutting Room – Stockholm, Sweden, February 2003
 Album cover and art direction by David K

References 

2003 albums
Amorphis albums
Virgin Records albums
EMI Records albums
Nuclear Blast albums
Mojo Records albums